Pulp Fiction is a type of work by stencil graffiti artist Banksy. Instances of it depict the characters played by Samuel L. Jackson and John Travolta in the 1994 film Pulp Fiction, with their guns replaced by bananas. A stencil graffiti work existed on a wall near the Old Street tube station in the City of London from 2002 to 2007. Prints of the image on its original site have been sold for £1,000. A print of the Pulp Fiction stencil was sold for £10,600 in 2012. On 24 November 2020 a signed print has fetched £125,000 at Tate Ward Auctions' "By Collectors for Collectors" event.

References

2000s murals
2002 paintings
Bananas in popular culture
Lost paintings
Murals in London
Works by Banksy
Cultural depictions of Quentin Tarantino
Cultural depictions of John Travolta